A Streetcar Named Desire is a 1995 American drama television film produced and directed by Glenn Jordan and starring Alec Baldwin, Jessica Lange, John Goodman and Diane Lane. It aired on CBS on October 29, 1995. Based on the 1947 play by Tennessee Williams, it follows a 1951 adaptation starring Marlon Brando and a 1984 television adaptation. The film was adapted from a 1992 Broadway revival of the play, also starring Baldwin and Lange.

Plot summary

Cast
 Alec Baldwin as Stanley Kowalski
 Jessica Lange as Blanche DuBois
 John Goodman as Harold 'Mitch' Mitchell
 Diane Lane as Stella Kowalski
 Frederick Coffin as Steve
 Carlos Gómez as Pablo
 Jerry Hardin as The Doctor
 Patricia Herd as The Matron
 Matt Keeslar as Collector
 Tina Lifford as The Neighbor
 Rondi Reed as Eunice
 Carmen Zapata as Flower Seller

Awards
In 1996, Jessica Lange won a Best Actress Golden Globe for her performance in this film. It was nominated for several other awards including four Emmy Awards.

References

External links

 
 
 

1995 television films
1995 films
1995 drama films
1990s American films
1990s English-language films
American drama television films
American films based on plays
CBS network films
Films about educators
Films based on works by Tennessee Williams
Films directed by Glenn Jordan
Films scored by David Mansfield
Films set in New Orleans
Films shot in New Orleans